"Call Me" is a song recorded and produced by the American-based group Deee-Lite. It was released by Elektra Records as the fourth single of their third studio album, Dewdrops in the Garden, and their sixth and final single to reach the number one position on the Billboard dance chart, during the week ending February 4, 1995.

Critical reception
Larry Flick from Billboard described it as "a hardcore club offering that places more emphasis on the act's talent for hearty beats than its quirky persona." He added, "Lady Kier's vamps are always a pleasure, but DJs are more likely to dig the double-pack of mixes that dabble in a wide variety of trendy vibes, ranging from pop/house to trance and tribal. Deserves immediate attention."

Formats and track listings
US CD Maxi single
 Call Me (Sampladelic Mix)  3:52 
 Call Me (Ralphi's Extended LP Mix) 5:06 
 Call Me (Ralphi's Intense Dub Mix) 4:50
 Call Me (H-Man * 69 Mix) 6:30
 Call Me (Method One Jungle Remix) 5:50
 Apple Juice Kissing (Album Version) 3:14)

See also
List of number-one dance singles of 1995 (U.S.)

References

1994 singles
1994 songs
Deee-Lite songs
Elektra Records singles
Songs written by Towa Tei
Songs about telephone calls